Al-Mufradat fi Gharib al-Quran is a dictionary of Qur'anic terms by 11th-century Sunni Islamic scholar Al-Raghib al-Isfahani.

It is widely considered by Shia Muslims to hold the first place among works of Arabic lexicography in regard to the Qur'an.

See also
 List of Shia books

References

Books about Islam